Alejandra Mitchelle Carrión Hernández (born November 5, 1996) is a Puerto Rican footballer who plays as a midfielder. She has been a member of the Puerto Rico women's national team.

International career
Carrión capped for Puerto Rico at senior level during the 2016 CONCACAF Women's Olympic Qualifying Championship.

References

1996 births
Living people
Women's association football midfielders
Puerto Rican women's footballers
Puerto Rico women's international footballers
21st-century American women